LA Fitness (doing business as LA Fitness International LLC) is an American gym chain with more than 700 clubs across the United States and Canada. The company was founded in 1984 and is based in Irvine, California.

History

LA Fitness was founded in 1984 by founder Chinyol Yi and Louis Welch in Los Angeles, California. Through the mid-1990s, the company expanded by acquiring under-performing fitness clubs in southern California, and by developing, opening and operating newly constructed properties.

In 2007, the company expanded outside of the United States by acquiring six fitness clubs in Toronto, Ontario, Canada. In 2010, the company acquired ten locations in Phoenix from Pure Fitness Arizona.  Within a year, all but one of the former Pure Fitness clubs were closed. 

In the 2009 Collier Township shooting, also referred to as the LA Fitness shooting because it took place in an LA Fitness health club in Collier Township, Allegheny County, Pennsylvania, four people were killed.

On November 30, 2011, the company completed the acquisition of 171 clubs, for $153M, from Bally Total Fitness. LA Fitness then began closing some former Bally Fitness clubs near existing LA Fitness facilities and remodeling others.

On July 2, 2012, the company completed the acquisition of all 33 Lifestyle Family Fitness Clubs in Florida. According to Lifestyle CEO, Stuart Lasher, "we evaluated our option to remain an independent company or to sell to a larger organization. After careful consideration, the board of directors has made the decision to sell all the Lifestyle Family Fitness clubs in Florida to LA Fitness."

On December 23, 2013, LA Fitness announced the acquisition of The Buffalo and Rochester Athletic Clubs in western New York.

On December 30, 2013, they completed the acquisition of all 10 Vision Quest Sport and Fitness clubs in the greater Seattle area.

Starting in 2018, LA Fitness offers high-intensity interval training classes at certain renovated clubs for a separate fee, incorporating heart rate monitors by Myzone.

In early 2020, LA Fitness launched their new down market Esporta Fitness brand (intended to compete with high volume low price gyms such as Planet Fitness), and rebranded several former LA Fitness locations as Esporta Fitness.

See also
PureGym, which bought all LA Fitness-branded gyms in the United Kingdom in 2015

References

External links

Health care companies established in 1984
Health clubs in the United States
Companies based in Irvine, California
Privately held companies based in California
Private equity portfolio companies
Madison Dearborn Partners companies
1984 establishments in California
American companies established in 1984
Medical and health organizations based in California